Clévenot is a surname. Notable people with the surname include:

Jules Clévenot (1876–1933), French water polo player, swimmer, and Olympian
Trévor Clévenot (born 1994), French volleyball player

French-language surnames